The Royal Marines Police, or Royal Marines Police Troop (RM Police Troop) is the Royal Marines element of the Royal Navy Police and the military police arm of the Royal Marines. 

Members of the RM Police enforce service law and discipline.

Duties and responsibilities
The RM Police is responsible for providing garrison policing services – law enforcement and crime prevention as well as general security advice to the command – and provide personnel to the Royal Navy Police Special Investigations Branch (RNP SIB) section for the investigation of serious crime.

RM Police personnel are recruited from within the trained strength of the Royal Marines, following completion of a first posting to a rifle troop in a Commando.

Units
The primary formed unit of the Royal Marines Police is a troop (similar to a platoon in the Army) within 30 Commando Information Exploitation Group, the information exploitation unit of 3 Commando Brigade Royal Marines, based at Stonehouse Barracks, Plymouth.

For example, in 2008 the RM Police Troop consisted of the following:

Captain (Officer Commanding) (x1)
Warrant Officer Class 2 (x1) 
Colour Sergeant (x2)
Sergeant (x3) 
Corporal (x9)
Lance Corporal (x21)
Civilian (attached) (x1).

Operations
In military operations, the Royal Marines Police Troop provide military police support for all phases of operations and peacekeeping operations including co-ordinating vehicle movements out of the beachhead, marking the main supply routes and providing convoy escorts. 

It also conducts general police duties and provides close protection for the Brigade Commander.  Personnel are eligible to undertake the close protection courses run by the Royal Military Police. Royal Marines Police personnel are also attached to other units.

Powers and authority
Marines and Warrant Officers of the Royal Marines Police are not constables and have no powers in relation to civil law enforcement. However, they are Service Police persons and do have authority under the Armed Forces Act 2006.

In 2009 the RM Police came under the operational command of the Royal Navy Police for policing and investigations; providing more investigatory independence from their non-service police chains of command. although it still exists as a distinct unit under the operational control of 3 Commando Brigade.

See also
Military police of the United Kingdom
Royal Navy Police
Royal Military Police
Royal Air Force Police
Ministry of Defence Police
United States Marine Corps Military Police

Notes

Royal Marine formations and units
Military police agencies of the United Kingdom